Dulgheru, meaning "carpenter", may refer to:

Dulgheru, a village in Saraiu Commune, Constanța County, Romania

People with the surname
Alexandra Dulgheru
Mirela Dulgheru
Mișu Dulgheru
Nicoleta Dulgheru

Romanian-language surnames
Occupational surnames